Claude Perraudin (4 April 1948 – January 2001) was a French composer, guitarist and conductor.

He was born in Paris in 1948 and died at Vincennes in January 2001.

Claude Perraudin worked with those famous artists :
 Jacques Dutronc (1967–1969)
 Claude François (1969–1972)
 Serge Lama (1973–1989)
 Serge Gainsbourg (1969–1973) on record, uncredited
 Brigitte Bardot (1969–1973) on record, uncredited
 Jane Birkin (1969–1973) on record, uncredited

Discography 
 Guitar Tenderness (1999)
 Janus (1989) nickname : Greg Baker
 Jogging (1981)
 Mutation 24 (1977)

References 

1948 births
2001 deaths
French guitarists
French male guitarists
French composers
French male composers
Musicians from Paris
20th-century French musicians
20th-century guitarists
20th-century French male musicians